The following players have been named captains and alternate captains of their Swedish Hockey League (SHL) teams for the 2016–17 season.

External links
SHL official website

       
Ice hockey captains